The discography of American rapper YNW Melly consists of two studio albums, two mixtapes, one extended play, and twenty-nine singles (including seventeen as a featured artist).

Studio albums

Mixtapes

Extended plays

Singles

As lead artist

As a featured artist

Other charted and certified songs

Notes

Guest appearances

References

Hip hop discographies
Discographies of American artists